Bedrino is a rural locality (a village) in Ivanovskoye Rural Settlement, Kovrovsky District, Vladimir Oblast, Russia. The population was 19 as of 2010.

Geography 
Bedrino is located 32 km south of Kovrov (the district's administrative centre) by road. Krasny Oktyabr is the nearest rural locality.

References 

Rural localities in Kovrovsky District